Mazdeh or Mezdeh may refer to:
 Mezdeh, Isfahan
 Mazdeh, Mazandaran
 Mazdeh, Razavi Khorasan